Piva Airfield is a former World War II airfield on Bougainville Island in the Solomon Islands archipelago.

History

World War II
The 3rd Marine Division landed on Bougainville on 1 November 1943 at the start of the Bougainville Campaign, establishing a beachhead around Cape Torokina. Small detachments of the 25th, 53rd, 71st and 75th Naval Construction Battalions landed with the Marines and the 71st Battalion was tasked with establishing a small fighter airfield that would become Torokina Airfield.

The first plane landed on the bomber strip on 19 December and it was put into operation on 30 December, after several weeks of operation it was extended by an additional . The 71st Battalion built three taxiways with 35 hardstands, a shop area, seven nose hangars, three prefabricated steel huts, and 26 frame buildings. Aviation camps consisted of a 5,000-man camp for Marine Aircraft Group 24. The 77th Battalion arrived on Bougainville on 10 December 1943 and began constructing a fighter airfield parallel to the bomber field. The airfield was completed on 3 January and the first plane landed on 9 January. Both airfields were connected by taxiways and shared fuel tank farms and other facilities. The construction of the airfields frequently took place under Japanese harassing fire such as the Bougainville counterattack, as the US forces never sought to occupy the entire island.

The bomber airfield became known as Piva 1, Piva North Airfield, Piva Uncle Airfield or Piva Bomber Strip while the fighter airfield became known as Piva 2, Piva South Airfield, Piva Yoke Airfield or Piva Fighter Strip.

US Navy units based at Piva included:
30 TB Squadron operating TBFs from 23 March 1944
VT-305 operating TBFs 1944
VB-305 operating SBDs 1944
VF-17 operating F4Us 

USMC units based at Piva included:
1st Marine Air Wing HQ
VMF-212 operating F4Fs from 20 January-20 March 1944
VMF-215 operating F4Us
VMD-254 (photo lab detachment) 16 January 1944
VMF(N)-531 operating PV-1 Venturas

RAAF units based at Piva included:
5 Squadron operating Wirraways and Boomerangs

RNZAF units based at Piva included:
3 Squadron operating PV-1s from August 1944
9 Squadron operating PV-1s from May–August 1944
15 Squadron operating F4Us from May–June 1944 and January–April 1945
20 Squadron operating F4Us from May–June 1944 and January–April 1945
23 Squadron operating F4Us from October–November 1944
24 Squadron operating F4Us October 1945
25 Squadron operating SBDs from 23 March 1944
30 Squadron operating TBFs from March – May 1944

On 30 January 1944 an F4U of VF-17 collided with an FG1 of VMF-211 over Piva Bomber Strip, both planes were destroyed and both pilots killed.

On 8 March 1944 Japanese artillery opened up on Piva Airfield and destroyed one B-24 Liberator and three fighters and damaged nineteen other aircraft.

By early 1945 base roll-up and salvage operations had commenced and were completed by the end of June 1945.

Postwar
The bomber airfield remains usable as Torokina Airport (IATA: TOK) (not to be confused with Torokina Airfield), while the fighter airfield is completely overgrown with vegetation.

See also
Torokina Airfield
United States Army Air Forces in the South Pacific Area

References

Airfields in the Pacific theatre of World War II
Airfields of the United States Navy
Airfields of the United States Army Air Forces in the Pacific Ocean theatre of World War II
Closed installations of the United States Navy